"Star Light, Star Bright" is an English language nursery rhyme. It has a Roud Folk Song Index number of 16339.

Lyrics
The lyrics usually conform to the following:
Star light, star bright,
First star I see tonight;
I wish I may, I wish I might
Have the wish I wish tonight.

Origins
The superstition of hoping for wishes granted when seeing a shooting or falling star may date back to the ancient world. Wishing on the first star seen may also predate this rhyme, which first began to be recorded in late nineteenth-century America. The song and tradition seem to have reached Britain by the early twentieth century and have since spread worldwide.

In popular culture

In Film 
The character Geppetto recites the full poem in the 1940 Disney animated film Pinocchio, wishing for the titular puppet character to become a real boy.

The rhyme appears in full in the 1928 film The Patsy when the character Patricia Harrington wishes to be "beautiful and seductive".

The rhyme was turned into a song in Abbott and Costello's In the Navy. The character Russ Raymond sings it in the beginning of the movie.

The Angel in The Bishop's Wife quotes the first line of the poem and tells the Bishop's Wife that she should make a wish.

In Richard Scarry's Best Sing-Along Mother Goose Video Ever!, Mother Cat sings "Star Light, Star Bright" to Huckle Cat, then Huckle Cat says the last two lines of the lullaby.

The rhyme appears in the 1966 Star Trek episode "The Conscience of the King" as a poem "almost as old as the stars themselves".

This song is played in Disney Parks Fireworks Shows Wishes: A Magical Gathering of Disney Dreams and Remember... Dreams Come True. They also play an exit music for those shows.

In Chuck E. Cheese's Out of this World show tape in 2014, the character Helen Henny recites the full poem in one of her lines.

"Star Light, Star Bright" is also found in Chilling Adventures of Sabrina Part Four on Netflix in the fifth episode of the season. Recited by Sabrina Spellman as she wishes for Sabrina Morningstar's safety.

The full poem is quoted in the 1995 animated film The Pebble and the Penguin.

The poem appears as a major plot point of the 2022 animated film Puss in Boots: The Last Wish. It is recited in full within the film’s introduction, explaining the origins of a wishing star that fell to Earth, and ultimately acts as a magic incantation to grant the titular "Last Wish" of whoever recites it atop the star.

In Novels 
The character Norma recites this poem in Steinbeck's 1947 novel The Wayward Bus.

In Music 
"Star Light, Star Bright" is found in Madonna's 1984 single "Lucky Star", as well as in "Star" by Earth, Wind & Fire, "This Flight Tonight" by Joni Mitchell, and "Imagination" by Jessica Simpson.

The lines "Wish I may, wish I might, have this wish I wish tonight" are also found in Metallica's song "King Nothing".

"Star Light, Star Bright" is also found in Starset's 2019 single "Manifest".

The lyrics form a section of the song "It's Raining" from Peter, Paul and Mary's 1962 debut album.

The chorus of the song "Pearl" by The Mamas & The Papas is also taken from this poem.

The full poem is quoted in the lyrics of "Wish Now" from Disney's Star Darlings, based on the characters by Ahmet Zappa and Shana Muldoon Zappa.

The rhyme is referenced in the song "Goodnight My Someone" from Meredith Willson's musical The Music Man.

Other 
The emblem "Star Light, Star Bright" is present in Destiny 2 and could be gained by purchasing an item from the Bungie Store.

Notes

American nursery rhymes
Songs about nights